Cecil Balmond OBE is a Sri Lankan–British designer, artist, and writer. In 1968 Balmond joined Ove Arup & Partners, leading him to become deputy chairman. In 2000 he founded design and research group, the AGU (Advanced Geometry Unit).

He currently holds the Paul Philippe Cret Chair at PennDesign as Professor of Architecture where he is also the founding director of the Non Linear Systems Organization, a material and structural research unit. He has also been Kenzo Tange Visiting Design Critic at Harvard Graduate School of Architecture (2000), Eero Saarinen Visiting Professor at Yale University School of Architecture (1997-2002) and visiting fellow at London School of Economics Urban Cities Programme (2002-2004).

In 2010 Balmond set up his own practice, Balmond Studio, with offices in London and Colombo. The research led practice is involved with art, architecture, design and consulting. One current project is the Gretna Landmark, Star of Caledonia for which Cecil is the artist. It is an illuminated sculpture that marks the Scottish and English border crossing, and will be completed in 2018.

He was appointed Officer of the Order of the British Empire (OBE) in the 2015 New Year Honours for services to architecture. In 2016 Balmond was also awarded the Thomas Jefferson Foundation Medal in Architecture by the University of Virginia.

Education
He went to Trinity College, Kandy and later studied engineering at the University of Colombo. After living briefly in Nigeria he moved to Britain and continued his studies at the University of Southampton and at Imperial College, London.

Philosophy
Balmond sees his work as an open-ended visual application of theory, following the principle that "structure as conceptual rigour is architecture". His approach to structure is derived by theories of complexity, non-linear organisation and emergence. Through his research, Balmond investigates mathematical concepts and their influence on natural forms and structures, interrogating algorithms, fractals, rhythm and cellular structure.

Life and work

Ove Arup & Partners

Balmond was deputy chairman at Arup. The AGU at Arup brought together architects, mathematicians, programmers, artists, musicians and scientists. It investigated structural systems, delving in the basin of order and patterns and engaging with music, algorithms, and malignant cellular structure to create abstract concepts that inspired tectonic forms. Under Balmond's artistic direction at the AGU, Balmond worked on some of the world's most famous structures including the Centre Pompidou-Metz with Shigeru Ban and CCTV Headquarters with Rem Koolhaas.

Serpentine Gallery

Balmond has also been a creative force behind London's Serpentine Pavilion programme. The Ito-Balmond Serpentine Pavilion, 2002 was crafted in glass and white-painted aluminium and featured a scatter of lines, the product of an algorithm designed by Balmond. The pavilion is now located at a luxury hotel in South of France. Balmond also designed pavilions with Daniel Libeskind (2001), Alvaro Siza and Eduardo Souto de Moura (2005) and Rem Koolhaas (2006).

Balmond Studio

Balmond set up his own studio and workshop in London 2010. Balmond's own designs are numerous and include Weave Bridge, a bridge for University of Pennsylvania (2010), the Pedro e Inês bridge in Coimbra (2006) and a $400m mixed-use development in Asia.

The Orbit

The ArcelorMittal Orbit is designed by Balmond and Anish Kapoor. It is a 120m high sculpture designed for the 2012 Olympics in Stratford, London. Balmond also collaborated with Kapoor on Marsyas a sculpture which was displayed in Tate Modern Turbine Hall (2002), and also co-designed the Tees Valley Giants art installations with Kapoor. Other key works by Balmond include a radical masterplan for Battersea Power Station (2006) and the Victoria & Albert Museum extension with Daniel Libeskind (1996).

Freedom Sculpture

The Freedom Sculpture is a stainless steel gold and silver monument located on Santa Monica Boulevard in a publicly accessible median at Century City, Los Angeles, California.

Selection of current projects

Art and architecture

 Star of Caledonia, iconic public sculpture, England/Scotland border (ongoing) 
 Public Artwork, Syracuse, New York, USA
 Public Artwork for the Black Hawk Mini Park Art Project, Iowa City, USA
 Public Artwork, CTA Wilson Station, Chicago, Illinois, USA
 Shade structure for the Mesa Arts Center in Mesa, Arizona, USA
 Snow Words, light sculpture, Alaska (completed in 2012) 
 ArcelorMittal Orbit for the 2012 Summer Olympics, London
 net_ Work, sculpture, Canada (completed in 2012)
 $400m mixed use development, Asia 
 Tower complex in Asia

Exhibitions

 2006, Informal, Arc en Reve, Bordeaux France
 2007 H_edge, Artists Space, New York USA
 2008 Frontiers of Architecture, Louisiana Museum of Modern Art, Denmark
 2009 Solid Void, Graham Foundation, Chicago USA
 2009 Forum 64, Carnegie Museum of Art, Pittsburgh USA
 2010 Element, Tokyo Opera City Art Gallery, Tokyo Japan

Architecture

	1970–1973 Carlsberg Brewery, Northampton, UK. Architect, Knud Munk 
	1975 Qatar University, Doha, Qatar. Architect, Kamal Kafrawi
	1978 -1984 Staatsgalerie Stuttgart, Germany. Architect, James Stirling 
	1983 Royal London House, Finsbury, London. Architect, Sheppard Robson
	1985 1 Poultry, London UK Architect, James Stirling, Michael Wilford and Associates
	1988–1992 Museo Thyssen-Bornemisza, Madrid Spain. Architect, Rafael Moneo 
	1989 Congrexpo, Lille France. Architect, OMA
	1992 -1999 Abando Passenger Interchange, Bilbao, Spain. Architect, James Stirling, Michael Wilford and Associates 
	1994 Kunsthal, Rotterdam, Netherlands. Architect, OMA
	1995–1998 Pavilion of Portugal in Expo'98, Lisbon. Architect, Alvaro Siza and Eduardo Souto de Moura
	1996 Victoria & Albert Museum, Spiral, London. Architect, Daniel Libeskind in collaboration with Cecil Balmond
	1997 Centraal station, Arnhem, Netherlands. Architect, UNStudio
	1997–2001 Imperial War Museum North, Salford, UK. Architect, Daniel Libeskind 
	1998 Portuguese National Pavilion Expo 1998, Lisbon, Portugal. Architect: Alvaro Siza and Eduardo Souto de Moura
	1998 Maison a Bordeaux, France. Architect, OMA
	1999 University of Graz Music School, Austria. Architect, UNStudio
	1999–2004 Seattle Central Library, USA. Architect, OMA/LMN Architects 
	1999 Casa da Musica, Porto, Portugal. Architect OMA (2005)
	2000 Portuguese Pavilion Expo 2000, Hannover, Germany. Architect Alvaro Siza and Eduardo Souto de Moura
	2000 Prada, Los Angeles, CA USA. Architect, OMA (2004)
	2001 Serpentine Pavilion, London UK. Architect Daniel Libeskind with Arup
	2002 St Francois d'Assise. Olivier Messiaen stage design and costumes. Daniel Libeskind with Thore Garbers. Artistic consulting, Cecil Balmond
	2002 Serpentine Pavilion, London. Architect Toyo Ito with Balmond
	2002 Marsyas, Tate Modern, London. Sculptor Anish Kapoor
	2003 Battersea Power Station Masterplan, London.
	2003 Grand Egyptian Museum, Giza, Cairo. Architect, Heneghan Peng Architects
	2002–2008 China Central Television Headquarters, Beijing (CCTV). Architect, OMA 
	2002 Installation of Louis Vuitton, Tokyo, Japan. Architect, Farjadi Architects
	2002 British Pavilion, Venice Art Biennale. Design Chris Ofili with AGU and Adjaye/Associates
	2004–2009 Centre Pompidou-Metz, France. Architect Shigeru Ban, Jean de Gastines and Philip Gumuchdjian 
	2004 St Louis Forest Park, MO USA. Architect Shigeru Ban with Cecil Balmond
	2004–2006 Pedro e Inês bridge, Mondego River. Coimbra, Portugal. Design Cecil Balmond/AGU with Antonio Adao da Fonseca/AFA 
	2005 Serpentine Pavilion, London. Alvaro Siza and Eduardo Souto de Moura with Cecil Balmond
	2006 Taichung Metropolitan Opera House, Taichung, Taiwan. Architect Toyo Ito and Associates
	2006 Serpentine Pavilion, London. Rem Koolhaas and Cecil Balmond
	2007 Tees Valley Giants, UK. Cable Net Sculpture, Middlehaven. Artist Anish Kapoor and Cecil Balmond
	2007 Hotel Le Beauvallon masterplan, Saint-Tropez, France. Architect Cecil Balmond and AGU
	2008 Institute of the Pen, Medina, Saudi Arabia. Design Cecil Balmond/AGU
	2009 Weave Bridge, University of Penn. Architect, Cecil Balmond/AGU
	2012 $400m mixed use development, Asia
	2012 Tower complex, Asia
 2017 Freedom Sculpture, Century City, Los Angeles, California

Publications

 (1995) Natur und abstraction: lehrstuhl Jose Luis Mateo 
 (1996) Unfolding architecture: The Boilerhouse extension 
 (1997) New Structure and the Informal 
 (Prestel 1998) No 9, The Search for the Sigma Code 
 (Prestel 2002) informal 
 (2002) Anish Kapoor : Marsyas 
 (2002) Serpentine Gallery Pavilion 
 (2004) Souto de Moura with Cecil Balmond 
 (2004) Concrete Poetry Concrete Architecture in Australia
 (2005) Serpentine Pavilion 2005 
 (2006) Serpentine Pavilion 2006
 (2007) Frontiers of Architecture 
 (Prestel 2007) Element 
 (2008) A+U Cecil Balmond, Special Edition 
 (Prestel 2013) Crossover

Awards

 2002 Gengo Matsui prize, Japan, engineering
 2003, RIBA Charles Jencks award for Theory in Practice. 
 2005, Sir Banister Fletcher Prize
 2011, IED Gerald Frewer Memorial Trophy
 2011, Prince Philip Designers Prize shortlist
 2013, Snow Words – 50 best US public artworks of 2013, Public Art Network
 2015, Officer of the Order of the British Empire, Services to Architecture
 2016, Thomas Jefferson Foundation Medal in Architecture
 2017, Ada derana Sri Lankan of the year 2017

Professional associations and teaching

Professional associations

 1970, Member of the Institution of Structural Engineers
 1992, Honorary Architectural Association Diploma
 1998, Honorary Fellow of the Royal Institute of British Architects
 2009, Honorary Fellow of the Institution of Engineering Designers

Teaching

 2000, Visiting Kenzo Tange critic, Harvard Graduate School of Architecture
 2002–2004, Professor LSE – LSE Cities Programme
 1997–2002, Visiting Saarinen Professor, Yale University School of Architecture 
 2004, Paul Phillipe,Cret Professor of Architecture, Penn Design
 2005 to current day, Director, NSO, Penn Design

References

	^ a b Jonathan Glancey (2007-07-23). "Jonathan Glancey on radical architect Cecil Balmond | Art and design". London: The Guardian. Retrieved 2010-06-07.
	^ https://web.archive.org/web/20111002122756/http://www.worldarchitecturefestival.com/judging_judges_detail.cfm?officeContactId=2&eventYear=2008
	^ https://web.archive.org/web/20100527122206/http://www.upenn.edu/pennnews/current/latestnews/050809.html
	^ https://web.archive.org/web/20110724003206/http://www.nso.penndesign.net/pdf/NSO_personnel.pdf
	^ "A Return to Techne: On Cecil Balmond – Art Signal Magazine". Magazine.art-signal.com. Retrieved 2010-06-07.
	^ https://web.archive.org/web/20110112230738/http://magazine.art-signal.com/en/a-return-to-techne-on-cecil-balmond/
	^ http://www.sundaytimes.lk/100606/Plus/plus_01.html
	^ http://trib.com/news/local/article_306cd0bb-9af3-5236-9237-9e7545cd8618.html
	^ http://www.operacity.jp/ag/exh114/e/introduction.html
	^ Kabat, Jennifer (2007-02-07). "Thinking Outside the Box". Businessweek.com. Retrieved 2010-06-07.
	^ http://www.jannuzzismith.com/informal/resources/presspack.pdf

Sources
 The New Yorker: http://www.newyorker.com/reporting/2007/06/25/070625fa_fact_owen
 The New York Times: https://www.nytimes.com/2006/11/26/arts/design/26ouro.html?scp=2&sq=cecil+balmond&st=nyt
 Metropolis Magazine: https://web.archive.org/web/20080610204330/http://www.metropolismag.com/cda/story.php?artid=2455
 University of Pennsylvania School of Design: https://web.archive.org/web/20080309000950/http://www.design.upenn.edu/new/arch/facultybio.php?fid=267
 Ove Arup and Partners: https://web.archive.org/web/20080605041939/http://www.arup.com/arup/people.cfm?pageid=4373

External links
Balmond studio
Recent exhibition in Japan reviewed
Thinking Outside the Box

20th-century Sri Lankan architects
21st-century Sri Lankan architects
Alumni of Imperial College London
Alumni of the University of Colombo
Alumni of the University of Southampton
Alumni of Trinity College, Kandy
Burgher artists
Burgher writers
Engineers from London
Living people
Officers of the Order of the British Empire
Sri Lankan architects
Sri Lankan emigrants to the United Kingdom
Sri Lankan engineers
Year of birth missing (living people)